The women's doubles Tournament at the 2007 Hansol Korea Open took place between September 24 and September 30 on outdoor hard courts in Seoul, South Korea. Chuang Chia-jung and Hsieh Su-wei won the title, defeating Eleni Daniilidou and Jasmin Wöhr in the final.

Seeds

Draw

References
 Main Draw

Hansol Korea Open - Doubles
Korea Open (tennis)